Jatra Shuru is the debut album (released in 2000) of Bhoomi, a Bengali band based in Kolkata, India. The album became very popular in West Bengal, and was one of the top grossing albums in Bengali language.

Tracks
 Pocha Kaka
 Dildoria Re
 Barandaye Roddur
 Kam Sarse
 Madhur Madhur Chauni
 Rangila Re
 Kande Sudhu Mon
 Mone Aar Naire
 Dushtu Haowa
 Chokhar Deshe

References

Bhoomi (band) albums
2000 albums